WWEN (88.1 FM) is a radio station broadcasting a Catholic religious format. Licensed to Wentworth, Wisconsin, United States, the station covers the Duluth-Superior area. The station is an owned and operated affiliate of Real Presence Radio.

History
WWEN began broadcasting 2010. It was originally owned by American Family Association, and was an affiliate of American Family Radio's AFR Inspirational network. In 2016, the station was sold to Real Presence Radio for $200,000.

References

External links
 
 

Douglas County, Wisconsin
Radio stations established in 2010
2010 establishments in Wisconsin
WEN
Catholic radio stations
Catholic Church in Wisconsin